Baghlan University (Baghlan Province, Afghanistan) was established in 1993 as Hakim Naser Khesraw University, and later burned down in 1998 by the Taliban.  Following the fall of the Taliban the university resumed operation in 2003.  As of 2007, construction is ongoing on a permanent university complex in Hussain Khel. Baghlan University is one of the leaders in Afghanistan, one of the 5 best universities in the country.

Baghlan University is an institute of research and higher education.

Divisions 
 Engineering Faculty
 Agriculture Faculty
 Education Faculty

References

Universities in Afghanistan
Baghlan Province
Educational institutions established in 1993
1993 establishments in Afghanistan